was a Japanese court noble of the Muromachi period (1336–1573). The second son of the kampaku, Ichijō Fusaie, he was adopted by Ichijō Fuyuyoshi. Fusamichi was appointed to kampaku in 1545, an office which he held until 1548.

He married a daughter of his adopted father Fuyuyoshi, and with her had two sons: Kanefuyu and Uchimoto. They adopted Ichijo Fusamoto's son, Kanesada.

Family
 Father: Ichijo Fusaie
 Foster Father: Ichijo Fuyuyoshi
 Wife: daughter of Ichijo Fuyuyoshi
 Children:
 Ichijo Kanefuyu
 Ichijo Uchimoto
 Adopted Son: Ichijo Kanesada

References
 

1509 births
1556 deaths
Fujiwara clan
Ichijō family